Eightmile Creek is a stream in the U.S. state of Georgia. It is a tributary to Buckhead Creek.

A variant name is "Eight Mile Creek".

References

Rivers of Georgia (U.S. state)
Rivers of Burke County, Georgia